"Run For You" is the sixteenth single by Japanese boy band KAT-TUN. The song "Run For You" is featured in a TV commercial for the Suzuki Solio, while "Cosmic Child" will be used in commercials for Wacoal products. "Diamond" will be used as the "image song" for "Dramatic Game 1844".

Single information
Sixteenth single release from KAT-TUN. Regular Edition (First Press) includes tracks "Run For You", "Cosmic Child", "Diamond", and "& Forever" plus karaoke tracks of them. Different cover artworks are featured on three editions. Regular Edition includes tracks "Run For You", "Cosmic Child", "Diamond", and "Sweet Chain" plus karaoke tracks of them. Limited Edition includes a bonus DVD with a music video of the title song and its making-of. Different cover artworks are featured on three editions.

Chart performance
In its first week of its release, the single topped the Oricon singles chart, reportedly selling 151,782 copies. KAT-TUN gained their Sixteenth consecutive number one single on the Oricon Weekly Singles Chart since their debut with all their singles sold more than 200,000 copies and continued to hold the most consecutive number one singles since debut with fellow Johnny's group, NEWS. The group debuted in March 2006 and since then, they have reached number one on the Oricon chart for every single they have released. Their 5 albums have also topped the charts one after another, setting a record a total of 21 singles and albums in first place. Run for You was reported by Oricon Monthly rankings to sell 174,076 copies. 

By the end of the year, Run for You was reported by Oricon to sell 179,296 copies and was later certified Gold by RIAJ denoting over 100,000 shipments.

Track listing

Chart

References

External links
 Run For You product information

KAT-TUN songs
2011 singles
Oricon Weekly number-one singles
Billboard Japan Hot 100 number-one singles